Sweden chose their entry for Eurovision Song Contest 1973 in the national final Melodifestivalen 1973. One of the competitors was a group of four who, later in the year, would become ABBA, but they only finished 3rd with their own entry. Instead, the winner was the song "Sommaren som aldrig säger nej" ("Summer that never says no") with the group Malta. To avoid confusion, they changed their name to "The Nova" (with their backing group The Dolls) for the contest.  The song was translated into English with the title "You're Summer".

The song's lyrics were written by Lars Forsell, and it was composed by Monica and Carl-Axel Dominique.

Before Eurovision

Melodifestivalen 1973 
Melodifestivalen 1973 was the selection for the 14th song to represent Sweden at the Eurovision Song Contest. It was the 13th time that this system of picking a song had been used. 10 songwriters were selected by SVT for the competition. The final was held in the SVT Studios in Stockholm on 10 February 1973, presented by Alicia Lundberg and was broadcast on TV1 but was not broadcast on radio.

The third place act, Agnetha, Anni-Frid, Björn and Benny, returned to take part in Melodifestivalen 1974 under their new moniker ABBA.

At Eurovision 
The contest was held in Luxembourg and Sweden was drawn into spot 12. They finished 5th (out of 17).

Voting

References

External links
ESCSweden.com (in Swedish)
Information site about Melodifestivalen
Eurovision Song Contest National Finals

1973
Countries in the Eurovision Song Contest 1973
1973
Eurovision
Eurovision